Pacific Coast Highway may refer to:

Roads
 Pacific Coast Highway or PCH, segments of California State Route 1
 Pacific Coast Highway, parts of New Zealand State Highway 2 and all of New Zealand State Highway 25 and New Zealand State Highway 35.
 Pacific Coast Scenic Byway, segments of the U.S. Route 101:
U.S. Route 101 in Oregon 
U.S. Route 101 in Washington

Public transportation
Pacific Coast Highway station (A Line), a Los Angeles Metro Rail station in Long Beach, California
Pacific Coast Highway station (J Line), a Los Angeles Metro Busway station in Carson, California

Music
"Pacific Coast Highway", a song by The Mamas & the Papas from People Like Us, 1971
Pacific Coast Highway, the first solo album by Christopher Franke
"Pacific Coast Highway" (song), by Hole
"Pacific Coast Highway", a song by Sonic Youth from Sister
"Pacific Coast Highway", a song by Kavinsky from the EP Nightcall
"Pacific Coast Highway", a song by The Beach Boys from That's Why God Made the Radio
"Pacific Coast Highway", a song by The Hip Abduction and Trevor Hall

Games
Pacific Coast Highway (video game), a Frogger clone video game for the Atari 8-bit family

See also
Coast Highway
Pacific Highway (disambiguation)
PCH (disambiguation)